Korreh Siah or Koreh Siah or Korreh Seyah or  Korreh Siyah may refer to:
 Korreh Siah-e Shirin
 Korreh Siah-e Talkh